O'Fallon Township High School is a public secondary school in O'Fallon, Illinois. In 2009, OTHS was ranked 49th out of the top 100 high schools in Illinois by the Chicago Sun Times.

As of 2020, it is the largest public high school in Illinois by enrollment outside of Chicago.

History 

The first high school was founded in 1901 as a two-year school by William R. Dorris, who became the first principal, according to Brian Keller of the O’Fallon Historical Society. In 1900, the city had built a new building to serve as the elementary school. Room 10 was set aside for the high school studies. The first graduating class in 1903 had only five members. In 1920, O’Fallon’s high school officially became OTHS of District 203, and the original school song, “Blue and Old Gold”, was first sung at graduation in 1925.

The school's mascot is the Panther, for which the 1934 basketball team takes credit for choosing. The basketball team visited a sports store in 1934 and was impressed by the large picture of a panther in the store’s display window, according to Mr. George Bender, class of 1937. The team, not having a mascot of their own yet, liked the idea of using the panther. By November 1934, the team was nicknamed the Panthers, a name which would eventually represent the entire school.

As stated in the 1962 edition of The Panther, the symbology on O'Fallon Township High School's crest reflects the town's rich history of farming, industry, and coal mining. Today, the school's coat of arms/crest can be found in the Smiley Campus's 600 hallway on a bronze plaque gifted by the Class of 1961.

After a short tenure as an assistant principal, longtime teacher Rich Bickel became the principal in 2009, following the retirement of Steve Dirnbeck who served as the school's principal from 2003-2009.

Campuses 
The current main campus (Smiley), which houses grades 10-12 (sophomores, juniors, and seniors), was built and opened in 1958. Also, the district expanded the main campus by extending the street-side hallway, thus adding another hallway stretching the length of the school along with multiple new classrooms.

The district completed construction on the strictly 9th grade or freshman campus (Milburn) in the summer of 2009. The two campuses are about 10–15 minutes apart. The first class to attend the Milburn campus was the class of 2013.

Extracurricular activities

Sports 
The Panthers compete in the Southwestern Conference.

Baseball
Basketball
Bowling
Cross Country
Color Guard
Ice Hockey (competes in Mississippi Valley Club Hockey Association)
Football
Golden Girls Dance Team
Golf
Intramurals: Softball, Ultimate Frisbee, Quidditch
Lacrosse
Soccer
Softball
Swimming
Tennis
Track and Field
Volleyball
Wrestling
Marching band

Other extracurricular activities 

Art Club
Astronomy Club
Bass Fishing Club
BETA Club
Bleachermaniacs
Camera Club
Comics and Drawing Team
Chess Team
Chamber Choir
Cross Country
Concert Choir
Culture Mix
Drama Club
Ecology Club
Endeavours Literary Magazine
Fall Play
Future Business Leaders of America
Future Science Professionals
Fellowship of Christian Athletes
French Club
French Honor Society
Freshman Choir
Future Educators of America
Gay Straight Alliance
Geology Club
German Club
German Honor Society
Gold Rush Club (school spirit)
Government Club
History Club
Hockey
International Action (Interact) Club
Investment Club
Jazz Band
Jazz Choir
Air Force Junior Reserve Officer Training Corps
Lifesavers
Madrigals
Marching Band
Math Team
Mock Trial Club
Model United Nations
National Honor Society
Odyssey of the Mind
Japanese Culture Club
Panther Beat Broadcast
Players with a Passion
Prom Planning Committee
Religions United Interfaith Mosaic
Robotics Team
Saturday Scholars
Scholar Bowl Team
Science Olympiad Team
Show Choir
Speech Team
Spanish Club
Spanish Honor Society
Spring Musical
Sports Medicine Club
Sport Psychology Club
Students Against Destructive Decisions
Student Council
Thespian Society
(Varsity) Winter Guard
(Junior Varsity) Winter Guard
Wellness Club
Woman's Choir
Worldwide Youth in Science and Engineering Team
Yearbook Staff

Team achievements 
 JV Golden Girls won first place in both Lyrical in 2015 at the TDI State Championship.
 O'Fallon Winter Guard 2011 claimed the national title at Winter Guard International World Championships.
 The varsity baseball team earned the first team state trophy in school history by placing third in the IHSA State Tournament in 2006 and again in 2009.
 The 2022-23 Girl's Basketball won the Class 4A Championship at the IHSA Girls Basketball Tournament
 The Junior ROTC Drill Team placed first overall at the Gateway International Drill Competition held at Alton High School, Illinois.
 The varsity cheerleading team placed second at state in 2007, fourth at state in 2008, and second again in 2009.
 The boys' basketball team finished second at the 2007 State Basketball Tournament held in Peoria, Illinois at Bradley University, and finished fourth in 2010.
 The Golden Girls dance team placed first in state competition in March 2008.
 The O'Fallon Hockey Panthers won the MVCHA league 2A championship in the 1998–99 season 2016–17, and also the 2A south division in 1998–99, 1999–2000, and 2001–02 and 2015–16 seasons.
 O'Fallon Varsity Hockey team won the MVCHA 2A league championship in 2016–17 season against Freeburg/Waterloo
 The JV Hockey Panthers won the south division in 2003-04 and the JV 2A championship in 1996–97, 1997–98, 2002–03, and 2010–11.
 The Marching Panthers have won the veiled Prophet Parade for 20 consecutive years; they placed 20th at the 2014 Bands of America Grand National Championships, 22nd at the 2016 Bands of America Grand National Championships, 14th at the 2017 Bands of America Grand National Championships, 12th place finalists at the 2018 Bands of America Grand National Championships, and 18th at the 2021 Bands of America Grand National Championships.
 The Marching Panthers placed first with Best Visual and General Effect at the 2015 Bands of America Clarksville, TN Regional Championships; and placed 3rd at the 2017 Bands of America St. Louis Super Regional.
 The Winter Guard placed third at MCCGA Championships and 1st in state in 2009-2010.
 The Competitive Journalism team placed second in the IHSA State competition in April 2010.
 The 2009 Girls' Volleyball team won regionals for the first time in 17 years and advanced to the sectional finals.
 The 2010 Boys Cross Country team placed fifth in the 3A State meet, with a team average of 14:59 for 3 miles.
 The 2011 Boys Cross Country team placed second in the 3A state meet, O'Fallon's first Cross Country trophy.
 The 2012 Boys Cross Country team placed second in the 3A state meet.
 The 2011 Winter Guard placed first in Class A at the World Championships.
 The 2007-08 Scholar Bowl team went 37-4 and went to the IHSA class AA tournament for the first time in the school's history.

Notable alumni

 Bob Cryder, NFL
 Bernie Fuchs, Illustrator
 Roosevelt Jones, NBA

 Andrew Sanchez, UFC
 Gabby Windey, Denver Broncos cheerleader, winner of the 2021 Pop Warner Humanitarian Award, and reality television personality.

References 

Public high schools in Illinois
Schools in St. Clair County, Illinois
1901 establishments in Illinois